"End of Me" is a song by Canadian punk band Billy Talent. It was released on September 10, 2021 as the fourth single for their sixth album, Crisis of Faith, and features Weezer frontman, Rivers Cuomo, on guest vocals. The song was written by Ben Kowalewicz, Ian D'Sa, Jonathan Gallant, Jordan Hastings, and Cuomo.

Background 
Billy Talent cites the first half of the 1990s as one of the most influential eras of music for them, specifically noting Weezer's Blue Album. While writing "End of Me", Kowalewicz and D'Sa felt that the song combined elements of Weezer (specifically listing Pinkerton) with John Frusciante and Jimi Hendrix, and even went as far as to call the song "Hendrix+Weezer" before giving it an official name. Eventually, they asked Cuomo to sing on the song, to which he agreed:"We tracked it, mixed it and mastered it… And a couple months later, I was like, ‘Nope, every time I hear it, I hear Rivers singing on it – we have to get him on this song.’ And we’ve never met Rivers! Our manager gave his manager the song, and about a month later, we found out that he loved it and was happy to be part of it. He sent it back like BAM!" - Ben KowalewiczLyrically, the song addresses standing by your loved ones, regardless of the negative impacts they can sometimes have on your life.

Release and reception 
"End of Me" released alongside the announcement of Crisis of Faith on September 10, 2021. The song topped the Canadian Rock Chart, and remained there for 12 weeks, making it the longest any of their singles have stayed at No. 1.

Critically, the song was met mostly positive feedback. Rock Sound's Jack Rogers called it "a classic piece of quirk-filled rock and roll that Billy Talent produce so wonderfully," while NME's Matt Doria praised D'Sa's guitar playing, calling the main riff "fierce, if somewhat pared-back." Matt Parker of Guitar World praised the song's ability to channel both The Blue Album and Jimi Hendrix, specifically mentioning the latter's song, "Hey Joe."

Music video 
A music video for "End of Me" was released on September 27, 2021. The video shows likenesses of Kowalewicz and Cuomo, but with bare skulls in place of their heads, as they endures various life-threatening situations. These include getting stuck in a spiderweb, being surrounded by explosives, trapped in various torture devices, and more. The video was created by Liam Lynch, who also portrays Kowalewicz, Cuomo, and the other various characters.

Personnel 
Billy Talent
 Ben Kowalewicz - lead vocals, songwriting
 Ian D'Sa - guitars, synthesizers, piano, backing vocals, producer
 Jonathan Gallant - bass, songwriting
 Jordan Hastings - drums, songwriting

Additional musicians

 Rivers Cuomo - vocals

Production

 Eric Ratz - engineering
 Ted Jensen - engineering
 Chris Lord-Alge - mixing

Charts

References 

2021 singles
2021 songs
Billy Talent songs
Songs written by Ian D'Sa
Songs written by Benjamin Kowalewicz
Songs written by Jonathan Gallant